The University of Rhode Island (URI) is a public land-grant research university with its main campus in Kingston, Rhode Island, United States. It is the flagship public research as well as the land-grant university of the state of Rhode Island. Its main campus is located in the village of Kingston in southern Rhode Island. Satellite campuses include the Feinstein Campus in Downtown Providence, the Rhode Island Nursing Education Center in Providence's Jewelry District, the Narragansett Bay Campus in Narragansett, and the W. Alton Jones Campus in West Greenwich.

The university offers bachelor's degrees, master's degrees, and doctoral degrees in 80 undergraduate and 49 graduate areas of study through nine academic schools and colleges. These schools and colleges include Arts and Sciences, Business, Education and Professional Studies, Engineering, Health Sciences, Environment and Life Sciences, Nursing, Pharmacy and Oceanography. Another college, University College for Academic Success, serves primarily as an advising college for all incoming undergraduates and follows them through their first two years of enrollment at URI. The university is classified among "R2: Doctoral Universities – High research activity". As of 2019, the URI enrolled 14,653 undergraduate students, 1,982 graduate students, and 1,339 non-degree students, making it the largest university in the state.

History 
The University of Rhode Island was first chartered as the Rhode Island State Agricultural School, associated with the state agricultural experiment station, in 1888. The site of the school was originally the Oliver Watson Farm in Kingston, whose original farmhouse is now a small museum. In 1892, the school was reorganized as the Rhode Island College of Agriculture and Mechanic Arts. That year, it extended courses of study from two years to four years; URI reckons 1892 as its founding date. The first class had only seventeen students, each completing their course of study in two years. In 1909, the school's name was again changed to Rhode Island State College as the school's programs were expanded beyond its original agricultural education mandate.

In 1951 the school was given its current title through an act of the General Assembly following the addition of the College of Arts and Sciences and the offering of doctoral degrees. The Board of Governors for Higher Education, appointed by the governor, became the governing body of the university in 1981 during the presidency of Frank Newman (1974–1983). The Board of Governors was replaced by the Rhode Island Board of Education in 2013, and by a 17-member Board of Trustees in 2019.

In 2013 the faculty adopted an open-access policy to make its scholarship publicly accessible online.

Presidents 

Twelve individuals have served as president, and three others have served as acting president of the University of Rhode Island. Marc B. Parlange is the current president, having served since August 2021.

Main campus
URI's main campus is located in northern South Kingstown, and is accessed via Rhode Island Route 138 from either the west (Interstate 95) or east (United States Route 1). The campus was mostly farmland when it was purchased by the state in 1888, and still includes the c. 1796 Oliver Watson Farmhouse. The early buildings of the campus are set around its main quadrangle, and were built out of locally quarried granite. The campus master plan was developed by the noted landscape architects Olmsted, Olmsted & Eliot in the 1890s. The central portion of the campus, where most of its pre-1950 buildings are located, was listed on the National Register of Historic Places in 2017.

Gallery

Academics 

URI is accredited by the New England Commission of Higher Education. The student-faculty ratio at University of Rhode Island is 16:1, and the school has 43.1% of its classes with fewer than 20 students. The most popular majors at University of Rhode Island include: Registered Nursing/Registered Nurse; Psychology, General; Speech Communication and Rhetoric; Kinesiology and Exercise Science; and Health-Related Knowledge and Skills, Other. The average freshman retention rate, an indicator of student satisfaction, is 84%.

Rankings 
U.S. News & World Report ranks URI tied for 170th overall among 389 "national universities" and tied for 83rd out of 209 "top public schools" in 2021.

 40th in ''Pharmacy (tie)" in 2021
 47th in "Best Library and Information Studies Program (tie)" in 2021
 53rd in ''Best Nursing School: Master's (tie)'' in 2021
 54th in ''Earth Sciences (tie)'' in 2021
 80th in ''Best Nursing School: Doctor of Nursing Practice (tie)'' in 2021
 101st in ''Clinical Psychology (tie)'' in 2021
 102nd in "Physical Therapy (tie)" in 2021
 108th in "English (tie)" in 2021
 109th in "Speech-Language Pathology (tie)" in 2021
 119th in ''Computer Sciences (tie)'' in 2021
 119th in "Best Education Schools (tie)" in 2021
 122nd in "Chemistry (tie)" in 2021
 127th in "Mathematics (tie)" in 2021
 131st in "Psychology (tie)" in 2021
 132nd in ''Best Undergraduate Engineering Program'' in 2021.
 140th in ''Biological Sciences (tie)'' in 2021
 146th in "Physics (tie)" in 2021
 154th-202nd in "Best Engineering Schools" in 2021
Academic Ranking of World Universities ranks URI for 51-75 globally for ''Oceanography'' in 2021.

Admissions 
The average incoming freshman at the Kingston campus for the fall of 2017 had a GPA of 3.54 and an SAT score of 1178 (out of 1600) (with ACT scores converted to SAT scale).

Student clubs
URI has 18 club sports teams consisting of around 600 athletes. Club sports the school offers include soccer, tennis, equestrian, ultimate frisbee, volleyball, field hockey, wrestling, crew, gymnastics, lacrosse and sailing, amongst others. These teams travel and compete against other intercollegiate programs in the country. URI also has 20+ intramural sports, including volleyball, badminton, dodgeball, and soccer. The intramural sports allow students to compete in tournaments and games with other students on campus.

URI also has over 300 student organizations and clubs. The university's student newspaper, The Good Five Cent Cigar, was founded in 1971. It is also home to several Greek-lettered organizations.

Athletics 

The University of Rhode Island competes in 16 intercollegiate sports. The university is a member of the Atlantic 10 Conference and the Colonial Athletic Association in the NCAA Division I Football Championship Subdivision.

The Rhode Island Rams men's basketball competes in the Atlantic 10 Conference, and has appeared in the NCAA "March Madness” Tournament a total of 10 times since its first appearance in 1961. Two of these ten appearances occurred during the 2017 and 2018 seasons.

Athletic facilities include the Ryan Center, Keaney Gymnasium, Meade Stadium, Mackal Field House, Tootell Aquatic Center, Bradford R. Boss Arena, URI Soccer Complex, Bill Beck Field, and URI Softball Complex.

Off campus living
While 5600 students live in the 25 on campus residence halls, thousands more opt to commute from the surrounding area. Narragansett, an abutting town to Kingston, is made up of hundreds of summer vacation homes which are rented to students for the academic year.

Notable alumni
Notable University of Rhode Island alumni in politics and government include Lieutenant General (retired) Michael Flynn (B.Sc. 1981), 38th mayor of Providence Jorge Elorza (B.Sc. 1998), and governors of Rhode Island Lincoln Almond (B.Sc. 1959) and J. Joseph Garrahy (1953).

Notable graduates in journalism and media include CNN correspondent John King (B.A. 1985), CNN anchor Christiane Amanpour (B.A. 1983), and CBS correspondent Vladimir Duthiers (B.A. 1991).

Among URI's alumni in the arts and entertainment are actors J. T. Walsh, Peter Frechette (B.F.A.), Amanda Clayton, and Andrew Burnap (recipient of the 2020 Tony Award- Best Actor in a Play, The Inheritance.) 

Notable graduates in business and finance include billionaire Ben Navarro (B.Sc. 1984); former president of American Airlines, Robert Crandall (1960); and former CEO of CVS, Thomas Ryan (1975).

Notable faculty

 Robert Ballard, undersea archaeologist and discoverer of the wreck of the Titanic
 Yehuda Hayuth, Israeli professor of geography, and President of the University of Haifa
 Natalie Kampen
 Joëlle Rollo-Koster
 Andrea Rusnock
 Melvin Stern
 Robert Weisbord

See also 

 URI Botanical Gardens
 Joint Degrees in law at Roger Williams University School of Law

References

External links

 

 
Educational institutions established in 1888
Flagship universities in the United States
Land-grant universities and colleges
South Kingstown, Rhode Island
Buildings and structures in Washington County, Rhode Island
Education in Washington County, Rhode Island
Tourist attractions in Washington County, Rhode Island
1888 establishments in Rhode Island
Historic districts in Rhode Island
National Register of Historic Places in Washington County, Rhode Island
University of Rhode Island